Kangju Kangri is a mountain in the Karakoram Range of Asia located in the union territory of Ladakh, India. With a summit elevation of 6,725 meters above sea level, it is the highest peak of the Pangong range, a subrange of the Karakoram. Kangju Kangri rises over the winding, tri-headed Kangju glacier and Pangong Lake to the east.

See also
 List of Ultras of Tibet, East Asia and neighbouring areas

References

External links
 "Kangju Kangri, India" on Peakbagger

Mountains of Ladakh
Six-thousanders of the Karakoram